Angora Province may refer to:

 Ankara Eyalet
 Ankara Vilayet

Province name disambiguation pages